The 1981–82 season was the 80th in the history of the Western Football League.

The league champions for the fourth time in their history were Bideford. The champions of Division One were Shepton Mallet Town.

Premier Division
The Premier Division remained at twenty clubs after Paulton Rovers and Tiverton Town were relegated to the First Division, and two clubs joined:

Chippenham Town, champions of the First Division.
Wellington, runners-up in the First Division.

League table

First Division
The First Division remained at nineteen clubs after Brixham United left the league, and Chippenham Town and Wellington were promoted to the Premier Division. Three new clubs joined:

Paulton Rovers, relegated from the Premier Division.
Tiverton Town, relegated from the Premier Division.
Wimborne Town, from the Dorset County League.

League table

References

Western Football League seasons
6